Wood Dale is a city in Addison Township, DuPage County, Illinois, United States. Per the 2020 census, the population was 14,012.

History
Wood Dale was originally known as Lester's Station, after John Lester, an early settler.

Geography

Wood Dale shares borders with Elk Grove Village (on the north), Bensenville (east), Addison (south, southwest) and Itasca (west).

Demographics
As of the 2020 census there were 14,012 people, 5,135 households, and 3,684 families residing in the city. The racial makeup of the city was 68.93% White, 1.84% African American, 0.93% Native American, 6.09% Asian, 0.00% Pacific Islander, 10.87% from other races, and 11.33% from two or more races. Hispanic or Latino of any race were 26.01% of the population.

There were 5,135 households, out of which 54.08% had children under the age of 18 living with them, 52.95% were married couples living together, 13.18% had a female householder with no husband present, and 28.26% were non-families. 22.96% of all households were made up of individuals, and 11.43% had someone living alone who was 65 years of age or older. The average household size was 3.18 and the average family size was 2.68.

The city's age distribution consisted of 21.6% under the age of 18, 9.6% from 18 to 24, 25.5% from 25 to 44, 27.7% from 45 to 64, and 15.5% who were 65 years of age or older. The median age was 39.2 years. For every 100 females, there were 105.5 males. For every 100 females age 18 and over, there were 97.5 males.

The median income for a household in the city was $75,521, and the median income for a family was $88,365. Males had a median income of $46,114 versus $32,100 for females. The per capita income for the city was $36,563. About 5.4% of families and 7.1% of the population were below the poverty line, including 8.7% of those under age 18 and 8.9% of those age 65 or over.

Note: the US Census treats Hispanic/Latino as an ethnic category. This table excludes Latinos from the racial categories and assigns them to a separate category. Hispanics/Latinos can be of any race.

Wood Dale has two primary schools, Oakbrook Elementary School(k-2)  and Westview Elementary School(3-5) , and one middle school, Wood Dale Junior High School(6-8) as well as Holy Ghost. Wood Dale shares Fenton High School  with Bensenville.

Economy
The top 5 employing industry sectors in Wood Dale are manufacturing (13.6%), retail trade (11.0%), health care (9.7%), wholesale trade (5.4%) and administration (8.4%). A plurality of the workforce commutes from Chicago, followed by Wood Dale itself, Elk Grove Village and Bensenville. The top 5 employing industry sectors of community residents are wholesale trade (20.3%), manufacturing (18%), manufacturing (11.3%), administration (10.6%) and healthcare (7.5%). The median income for a household in the city was $57,509, and the median income for a family was $62,289. Males had a median income of $45,884 versus $35,247 for females. The per capita income for the city was $25,507.  About 2.9% of families and 4.1% of the population were below the poverty line, including 5.9% of those under age 18 and 3.2% of those age 65 or over. At one time Claire's had a distribution facility in Wood Dale. That function is now handled by its Hoffman Estates office.

Principal employers
According to Wood Dale's 2018 Comprehensive Annual Financial Report, the top employers in the city are:

Transportation
Wood Dale has a station on Metra's Milwaukee District/West Line, which provides daily rail service between Elgin, Illinois, and Chicago, Illinois (at Union Station). Illinois Route 390 is in the city's corporate limits near the northern border of the city and has an exit to Wood Dale Road.

Sister cities
  Cefalù, Italy
Chicago, Illinois

Notable people

 Colin Brady, American animator and film director, raised in Wood Dale.
 Henry Hyde, Republican member of the United States House of Representatives from 1975 to 2007, resided in Wood Dale.
 Natalie Jaresko, Ukraine's Minister of Finance (2014–2016); raised in Wood Dale.
 Monica Pedersen, Chicago designer for HGTV shows Designed to Sell and Dream Home.
 James "Pate" Philip, President of the Illinois Senate (1993-2003); resides in Wood Dale.
 Ray Soden, Illinois state senator; lived in Wood Dale.
 Jim Spivey, retired American middle-distance runner and three time Olympian, raised in Wood Dale.
 Christine Winger, Republican member of the Illinois House of Representatives (2015–2019). She served as a member of the Wood Dale City Council prior to serving as State Representative.

References

External links

 City of Wood Dale

1928 establishments in Illinois
Chicago metropolitan area
Cities in DuPage County, Illinois
Cities in Illinois
Populated places established in 1928